1st Anniversary is the debut album by J-pop group Melon Kinenbi, containing their first eight singles, all released within their first year of operation. It was released on March 12, 2003. Its highest ranking on the Oricon weekly chart was #11.

The track "This Is Unmei" sold over 12,740 copies and reached #28 on the Oricon weekly chart.

Track listing

"Anniversary"

"Endless Youth"

References

2003 debut albums
Melon Kinenbi albums
Zetima albums
Japanese-language albums
Albums produced by Tsunku